Jim Hall & Pat Metheny is an album by jazz guitarists Jim Hall and Pat Metheny that was released by Telarc on April 27, 1999. The album contains eleven studio recording tracks and six live tracks.

Reception

Rick Anderson, writing for AllMusic, said that Hall and Metheny "...are such a natural fit that it's amazing no one's thought of getting them together for a duo album before." He said the "...interplay is nothing short of astounding, and the five improvisational pieces...sometimes sound as organized as the standards." He said "...the complete lack of high frequencies in both guitarists' tones might leave you wondering if you've got water in your ear", but that it "really is a wonderful album."

The All About Jazz review said that "what we hear...is certainly an affinity", and that the record is "...worthy of repeated listening". They praised the composition as well, saying that they "assume a deceptive melodic simplicity deepened in profundity by unconventional intervals or modulations that proceed unhurriedly as the sound washes over the listener."

Track listing

Jim Hall is featured on the left channel, Pat Metheny to the right.

Personnel 
 Jim Hall – electric guitar
 Pat Metheny – electric, acoustic, fretless acoustic, and 42-string Pikasso guitar

Production
 Gil Goldstein – producer
 Pat Metheny – producer
 Steve Rodby – producer
 Jay Newland – recording, mixing
 Ted Jensen – mastering
 Anilda Carrasquillo – artwork 
 Deborah Feingold – photography

Charts
Album – Billboard

References

Jim Hall (musician) albums
Pat Metheny albums
1999 albums
Instrumental albums